The Australian Terrier is a small breed of dog of the terrier dog type. The breed was developed in Australia, although the ancestral types of dogs from which the breed descends were from Great Britain.

Appearance 

Fur is shorter on the muzzle, lower legs, and feet, and there is a ruff around the neck. The coat colours are blue or silver and tan with a lighter coloured topknot, and with markings on face, ears, body and legs of a colour described in the breed standard as "tan, never sandy", or a solid red with a sandy variation. The tail was traditionally docked, in order to protect the dog from spinal injury while working and hunting in the field. As with most pet dog breeds, all proportions and aspects of the body and head as well as colours and markings are extensively described in the breed standard.

History 

The Australian Terrier is descended from the rough coated type terriers brought from Great Britain to Australia in the early 19th century. The ancestral types of all of these breeds were kept to eradicate mice and rats.  The Australian Terrier shares ancestors with the Cairn Terrier, Shorthaired Skye Terrier, and the Dandie Dinmont Terrier; Yorkshire Terriers and Irish Terriers were also crossed into the dog during the breed's development.

Development of the breed began in Australia about 1820, and the dogs were at first called the Rough Coated Terrier. The breed was officially recognised in 1850, and later renamed as the Australian Terrier in 1892. The Australian Terrier was shown at a dog show for the first time in 1906 in Melbourne, and was also shown in Great Britain about the same time. The Kennel Club (UK) recognised the breed in 1933. The American Kennel Club recognised the Australian Terrier in 1960, and the United Kennel Club (US) in 1970. It is now recognised by all of the kennel clubs in the English speaking world, and also is listed by various minor kennel clubs and other clubs and registries.

Health
There are three completed health surveys for Australian Terriers.  Two surveys, one in 1997 and one in 2002, have been conducted by the Australian Terrier Club of America. The Club is currently collecting data for their next survey.  
The UK Kennel Club has a 2004 survey, but it has a much smaller sample size than the Australian Terrier Club of America surveys.  Some of the respondents in the American surveys were from Australia, but there is no separate Australian health survey.

Mortality
In both 1997 and 2002 Australian Terrier Club of America surveys, median longevity of Australian Terriers was 11 years (total sample size of 230 deceased dogs).  In the Kennel Club (UK) 2004 survey, median longevity was 12.1 years, but the sample size was only 11 deceased dogs.  11 years is a typical median longevity for purebred dogs in general, but on the low end of longevities for breeds similar in size to Australian Terriers.

Major causes of death in the 2002 survey were cancer (67%), old age (17%), undetermined (16%), and diabetes (13%).

Morbidity
Among 619 living dogs in the 2002 Australian Terrier Club of America survey, the most commonly reported health problems were endocrine (primarily diabetes), allergic dermatitis, and musculoskeletal (primarily luxating patella and ruptured cranial cruciate ligament).  Other conditions reported among more than 4% of the surveyed dogs were adult onset cataracts and ear infections.  The much smaller 2004 UKC survey, with 28 living dogs, suggested similar health concerns.

Temperament
The breed standard describes the ideal Australian Terrier temperament as spirited, alert, "with the natural aggressiveness of a ratter and hedge hunter". Aussies  rank 34th in Stanley Coren's The Intelligence of Dogs, being of above average "Working and Obedience" intelligence, indicating good trainability. They tend to get along well with other dogs, although some males may not get along well with other males in the house. An Australian Terrier should never start a fight, but they will not back down from an attacker. Since the Australian Terrier was also bred for companionship, they tend to be very people friendly, and enjoy interacting with people.

See also
 Dogs portal
 List of dog breeds
 Terrier
 Australian Silky Terrier
 Terrier Group

References

External links 

FCI breeds
Dog breeds originating in Australia
Terriers